The following outline is provided as an overview of and topical guide to Lesotho:

Lesotho – sovereign country located in Southern Africa. Lesotho is an enclave completely surrounded by the Republic of South Africa. Formerly Basutoland, it is a member of the Commonwealth of Nations. The name Lesotho roughly translates into "the land of the people who speak Sesotho."

General reference 

 Pronunciation: 
 Common English country name:  Lesotho
 Official English country name:  The Kingdom of Lesotho
 Common endonym(s):  
 Official endonym(s):  
 Adjectival(s): Basotho
 Demonym(s):
 ISO country codes:  LS, LSO, 426
 ISO region codes:  See ISO 3166-2:LS
 Internet country code top-level domain:  .ls

Geography of Lesotho 

Geography of Lesotho
 Lesotho is: a landlocked country
 Location:
 Eastern Hemisphere and Southern Hemisphere
 Africa
 Southern Africa
 Surrounded by South Africa (the country)
 Time zone:  South African Standard Time (UTC+02)
 Extreme points of Lesotho
 High:  Thabana Ntlenyana 
 Low:  Confluence of Orange River and Makhaleng River 
 Land boundaries:   909 km
 Coastline:  none
 Population of Lesotho: 2,008,000  – 144th most populous country

 Area of Lesotho: 30,355 km2
 Atlas of Lesotho

Environment of Lesotho 

 Climate of Lesotho
 Wildlife of Lesotho
 Fauna of Lesotho
 Birds of Lesotho
 Mammals of Lesotho

Natural geographic features of Lesotho 

 Glaciers in Lesotho: none
 Rivers of Lesotho
 World Heritage Sites in Lesotho: None

Regions of Lesotho 

Regions of Lesotho

Ecoregions of Lesotho 

List of ecoregions in Lesotho

Administrative divisions of Lesotho 

Administrative divisions of Lesotho
 Districts of Lesotho

Districts of Lesotho 

Districts of Lesotho

Municipalities of Lesotho 

 Capital of Lesotho: Maseru
 Cities of Lesotho

Demography of Lesotho 

Demographics of Lesotho

Government and politics of Lesotho 

Politics of Lesotho
 Form of government: Parliamentary representative democratic constitutional monarchy
 Capital of Lesotho: Maseru
 Elections in Lesotho
 Political parties in Lesotho

Branches of the government of Lesotho 

Government of Lesotho

Executive branch of the government of Lesotho 
 Head of state: King Letsie III,
 Head of government: Prime Minister of Lesotho,

Legislative branch of the government of Lesotho 

 Parliament of Lesotho (bicameral)
 Upper house: Senate of Lesotho
 Lower house: National Assembly (Lesotho)

Judicial branch of the government of Lesotho 

Court system of Lesotho

Foreign relations of Lesotho 

Foreign relations of Lesotho
 Diplomatic missions in Lesotho
 Diplomatic missions of Lesotho

International organization membership 
The Kingdom of Lesotho is a member of:

African, Caribbean, and Pacific Group of States (ACP)
African Development Bank Group (AfDB)
African Union (AU)
Commonwealth of Nations
Food and Agriculture Organization (FAO)
Group of 77 (G77)
International Bank for Reconstruction and Development (IBRD)
International Civil Aviation Organization (ICAO)
International Criminal Court (ICCt)
International Criminal Police Organization (Interpol)
International Development Association (IDA)
International Federation of Red Cross and Red Crescent Societies (IFRCS)
International Finance Corporation (IFC)
International Fund for Agricultural Development (IFAD)
International Labour Organization (ILO)
International Monetary Fund (IMF)
International Olympic Committee (IOC)
International Organization for Standardization (ISO) (subscriber)
International Red Cross and Red Crescent Movement (ICRM)
International Telecommunication Union (ITU)

Inter-Parliamentary Union (IPU)
Multilateral Investment Guarantee Agency (MIGA)
Nonaligned Movement (NAM)
Organisation for the Prohibition of Chemical Weapons (OPCW)
Southern African Customs Union (SACU)
Southern African Development Community (SADC)
United Nations (UN)
United Nations Conference on Trade and Development (UNCTAD)
United Nations Educational, Scientific, and Cultural Organization (UNESCO)
United Nations High Commissioner for Refugees (UNHCR)
United Nations Industrial Development Organization (UNIDO)
Universal Postal Union (UPU)
World Customs Organization (WCO)
World Federation of Trade Unions (WFTU)
World Health Organization (WHO)
World Intellectual Property Organization (WIPO)
World Meteorological Organization (WMO)
World Tourism Organization (UNWTO)
World Trade Organization (WTO)

Law and order in Lesotho 

Law of Lesotho

 Law Enforcement in Lesotho
 Constitution of Lesotho
 Human rights in Lesotho
 LGBT rights in Lesotho

Military of Lesotho 

Military of Lesotho
 Command
 Commander-in-chief:
 Forces
 Army of Lesotho
 Navy of Lesotho: None

Local government in Lesotho 

Local government in Lesotho

History of Lesotho 

History of Lesotho
Current events of Lesotho

Culture of Lesotho 

Culture of Lesotho
 Cuisine of Lesotho
 Languages of Lesotho
 National symbols of Lesotho
 Coat of arms of Lesotho
 Flag of Lesotho
 National anthem of Lesotho
 People of Lesotho
 Public holidays in Lesotho
 Religion in Lesotho
 Hinduism in Lesotho
 Islam in Lesotho
 Sikhism in Lesotho
 World Heritage Sites in Lesotho: None

Art in Lesotho 
 Literature of Lesotho
 Music of Lesotho

Sports in Lesotho 

Sports in Lesotho
 Football in Lesotho
 Lesotho at the Olympics
 Cycling In Lesotho

Economy and infrastructure of Lesotho 

Economy of Lesotho
 Economic rank, by nominal GDP (2007): 159th (one hundred and fifty ninth)
 Communications in Lesotho
 Internet in Lesotho
 Companies of Lesotho
Currency of Lesotho: Loti
ISO 4217: LSL
 Health care in Lesotho
 Mining in Lesotho
 Tourism in Lesotho
 Transport in Lesotho
 Transportation in Lesotho
 Airports in Lesotho
 Rail transport in Lesotho

Education in Lesotho 

Education in Lesotho

See also 

Lesotho
Index of Lesotho-related articles
List of international rankings
List of Lesotho-related topics
Member state of the Commonwealth of Nations
Member state of the United Nations
Outline of Africa
Outline of geography

References

External links 

 Government of Lesotho
 Judgments of the Lesotho High Court
 Lesotho Internet Cafe directory
 

Lesotho